Hashem Akbari (born 13 August, 1949) is an Iranian-American professor of Building, Civil and Environmental Engineering at Concordia University. He specializes in research on the effects of urban heat islands, cool roofs, paving materials, energy efficiency, and advanced integrated energy optimization in buildings.

Biography 

Akbari was born in Iran. He received his Ph.D. of Nuclear Engineering at University of California, Berkeley in 1979. He became a U.S. citizen in 1991. In 2009, he joined the Concordia University, where he founded a comprehensive laboratory to measure solar spectral reflectance and thermal emittance of common construction materials. Prior to joining the Concordia University, he was a senior scientist and the leader of the Heat Island Group at Environmental Energy Technologies Division of Lawrence Berkeley National Laboratory (LBNL) at the University of California (from 1983 to 2009). In 1985, he founded the Urban Heat Island (UHI) group, where he worked in the areas of heat-island quantification, mitigation and novel techniques in the analysis of energy use in buildings and industry in the United States and abroad.

Research 
Akbari conducted ground-breaking research on the potential for cool roofing and paving materials to reduce the urban heat islands effect. His proposed work in adapting cool roofs as a "prescriptive" requirement for low-slope non-residential buildings in California. In 2003, his proposal was approved by the California Energy Commission, and it went into effect later in October 2005. He provided basis and assistance for the development of cool roofs standards in Florida, Chicago, Georgia, and Atlanta.

His research has quantified the effect of cool roofs (increasing surface albedo) on cooling the globe. As a result of his research, the heat-island mitigation program has been expanding in other countries; for example, the city of Osaka, Japan has recently instituted a $1.7 B (170 B Yen) program of cool roofs, green roofs, and urban trees.

Akbari's contribution to the development of several international standards are:

ASTM standard E1918 (Standard Test Method for Measuring Solar Reflectance of Small Horizontal and Low-Sloped Surfaces in the Field)
ASTM standard E1980 (Standard Practice for Calculating Solar Reflectance Index of Horizontal and Low-Sloped Opaque Surfaces)
 ASTM task group to develop a standard for accelerated aging of roofing materials (ASTM D7897 – 15: Standard Practice for Laboratory Soiling and Weathering of Roofing Materials to Simulate Effects of Natural Exposure on Solar Reflectance and Thermal Emittance)
 ASTM standards for solar reflectance and thermal emittance measurements
 ASHRAE Standards Committees of Standard 90.1: New commercial buildings
 ASHRAE Standard 90.2: New residential buildings, and updated the standards to offer credits for roofs with high solar reflectance
 A contributing member to ASHRAE Technical Committees: TC 1.4 (Control Theory and Application), TC 1.5 (Computer Applications), TC 4.7 (Energy Calculations), TC 7.1 (Integrated Building Design), TC 7.5 (Smart Building Systems), and TC 7.6 (Building Energy Performance)

In addition to the standards development, Akbari was the author of Intergovernmental Panel for Climate Change (2007 Nobel Peace Prize). He also contributed in writing of two chapters for ASHRAE Application Handbook: (1) Building Energy Monitoring and (2) Energy Use and Management. He published a guidebook for urban heat island mitigation.

Akbari is one of the founding organizers of the Global Cool Cities Alliance (vice Chairman of the Board, Technical committee chair), the Cool Roof Rating Council (CRRC) (Ex-Officio Board Member, International Committee Chair), and the European Cool Roof Council (ECPR) (Ex-Officio Board Member).

References

External links 

 Hashem Akbari's Profile at ResearchGate
 ECPR (European Cool Roof Council)
 CRRC (Cool Roofs Rating Council)
 GCCA (Global Cool Cities Alliance)

1949 births
Living people
American civil engineers
Academic staff of Concordia University
Lawrence Berkeley National Laboratory people
UC Berkeley College of Engineering alumni
Iranian emigrants to the United States